The 2003–04 OK Liga was the 35th season of the top-tier league of rink hockey in Spain.

Barcelona Excelent finished the league as champion.

Competition format
Sixteen teams joined the league.

The eight first teams at the end of the regular season qualified for the playoffs while the three last teams were relegated to Primera División.

Regular season

Playoffs
All series were played with a best-of-five series.

Seeded teams played games 1, 2 and 5 of the series at home.

Source:

Final standings

Copa del Rey

The 2004 Copa del Rey was the 61st edition of the Spanish men's roller hockey cup. It was played in Reus between the eight first qualified teams after the first half of the season.

Liceo Vodafone won its ninth title, the first one since 1997.

References

External links
Real Federación Española de Patinaje

OK Liga seasons
2004 in roller hockey
2003 in roller hockey
2004 in Spanish sport
2003 in Spanish sport